Bruin's Slave Jail is a two-story brick building in Alexandria, Virginia, from which slave trader Joseph Bruin imprisoned slaves.  Bruin's company, called Bruin and Hill, transported captured  Africans to slave markets in the Southern United States. At the start of the American Civil War, Bruin was captured and imprisoned in Washington, D.C.  His property, including the slave jail, was confiscated by U.S. Marshals and used as the Fairfax County Courthouse until 1865. All that remains today of the entire compound is a two-story brick structure that housed the enslaved people. Bruin's home, kitchen, and wash-house no longer remain.

See also
 Slave pen, also called slave jail

References

External links

Joseph Bruin and the Slave Trade, Official 2007 Historic Redevelopment Report
Information on Bruin's Slave Jail from Virginia African Heritage Program
Archaeology: Digging up History at the Bruin Slave Jail

Commercial buildings on the National Register of Historic Places in Virginia
National Register of Historic Places in Alexandria, Virginia
Slave trade in the United States
History of slavery in Virginia
Federal architecture in Virginia
Houses completed in 1819
Buildings and structures in Alexandria, Virginia
Jails on the National Register of Historic Places
Jails in Virginia
Slave pens